Roger Honegger (born 18 March 1964) is a Swiss former professional cross-country mountain biker and cyclo-cross cyclist. He won the cross-country event at the 1989 European Mountain Bike Championships.

Major results

Cyclo-cross

1987–1988
 2nd  UCI Amateur World Championships
1988–1989
 3rd  UCI Amateur World Championships
1989–1990
 3rd National Championships
1990–1991
 1st  National Championships
 7th UCI World Championships
1993–1994
 3rd National Championships
1994–1995
 3rd National Championships
 5th UCI World Championships

Mountain bike
1989
 1st  European XCO Championships
1992
 4th European XCO Championships
1993
 6th UCI World XCO Championships

References

External links

Living people
1964 births
Swiss male cyclists
Swiss mountain bikers
Cyclo-cross cyclists
People from Stäfa
Sportspeople from the canton of Zürich